The Bolinao Skull is an archaeological discovery excavated at the Balingasay Archaeological Site in Bolinao, Pangasinan in the Philippines. The Bolinao Skull is considered to be a one-of-a-kind find due to its gold dental decorations that resemble fish scales. This human skull find paved the way for further study of ornamental, burial, and trade practices by the people of the Philippines, particularly during the pre-Spanish period.

Description

The Bolinao Skull was discovered during an excavation led by archaeologists from the National Museum of the Philippines. Its most distinct feature is the dental decorations made of gold. At the Balingasay Site in Bolinao, Pangasinan, Philippines, archaeologists excavated 67 skulls, all of which had their teeth decorated in gold and were found with tradeware ceramics dating back to the Early Ming Dynasty in China circa 15th century A.D. The dental ornaments measure 10 millimeters wide by 11.5 millimeters in height. The gold scales were observed to be on the buccal surface of the upper and lower incisor and canine teeth.

Upon further examination, the teeth were found to have had holes drilled in them, which were filled by gold disks, plugs, pegs, or wire. Each type of ornament has a unique design.

Excavation and Exhibition
The Bolinao Skull dates back to the 14th and 15th century A.D. and was likely one of the historic inhabitants of Pangasinan, Philippines. This discovery reveals the ornate method of decorating teeth that was part of the native Philippine culture long before the Spanish occupation in 1521. The Bolinao Skull is now on display at the Pang-ulo Exhibit, on the fourth floor of the National Museum of Anthropology, a component museum of the National Museum of the Philippines, which is dedicated to anthropology and archaeology.

History of Dental Gold-work
Before the Spanish arrived in the Philippines, decorating teeth was a common practice. From staining them red or black, to decorating them with gold scales, the ornate practice of dental decoration was a status symbol for the Philippine natives. The work of Zumbroich and Salvador-Amores state that only eight out of the fifty-one burials unearthed from the 14th-15th century cemetery site in Bolinao had dentitions with gold ornamentations featuring varying elaborations. Evidence of deliberate teeth dyeing was also pointed out by the discoloration in the frontal teeth only. Other evidence of gold decorations was found in the Calatagan Peninsula. According to Antonio Pigafetta, the Visayans also practiced decorative dentistry. Upon meeting Rajah Siaui of Butuan, he described him as having “three spots of gold on every tooth” with "teeth [appearing] as if bound with gold". Tooth goldwork was called pusad, and the mananusad was the professional dental worker who was paid for his services.

In more recent times, dentists used gold to fill in cavities because the metal is soft and does not decay. For these same reasons, our ancestors used the metal for dental decoration in the pre-colonial era. The gold would be made into pegs that would be put in the teeth; this was a painful procedure. Teeth goldwork, therefore, was not just a sign of social status, but also of strength and bravery.

Terms

Pusad: Tooth goldwork.

Mananusad: Dental worker with tooth goldwork specialization.

Halop: Gold covering, gold plating (secured by pegs, caps extending beyond the gum line, and rivets running through the tooth).

Bansil: Gold pegs.

Ulok: A thumbnail-shaped awl used to drill into the tooth to insert the bansil, and filed even with the surface of the incisor teeth.

References

Archaeology of the Philippines
History of Pangasinan
Collections of the National Museum of the Philippines